The Forestry Library of the FAO Forestry Department, located at FAO headquarters in Rome and now part of the David Lubin Memorial Library, is a specialized library that holds approximately 6,000 books and over 600 current periodical titles, yearbooks and other serial titles on forestry and related areas. It also has a large collection of grey literature - including documentation on FAO forestry projects and papers and reports from various FAO Forestry meetings - much of which is not readily available anywhere else.

Subjects
Subjects covered include: 
 
 sustainable forest management
 fire management
 arid zone forestry
 forest health
 planted forests
 genetic resources
 wood energy
 harvesting
 industries
 trade and forests
 non-wood forest products
 biodiversity
 climate change
 desertification
 environment 
 utilization alien invasive species
 forests and water
 participatory processes
 forests and poverty reduction
 gender
 small-scale enterprises
 conflict management
 forest law compliance and governance
 national forests programmes
 global forest resource assessment 
 and other related subjects

See also 
 World Forestry Congress
 Unasylva: FAO's international journal of forestry and forest industries

External links 
 FAO Homepage
 FAO Forestry Department Homepage
 FAO Library Catalogue Online

Forestry education
Libraries in Rome
Forestry in Italy
Forest governance
Food and Agriculture Organization
International forestry organizations
Research libraries
Rome R. XXI San Saba